Soil is the first EP by American metal band SOiL. According to the band's vocalist, Ryan McCombs, this release was referred to by the band as "the worm disc". The tracks "Broken Wings" and "She" reappeared on a second EP, El Chupacabra, in 1998. Songs from both EPs then appeared on Soil's first album, Throttle Junkies, the following year.

Track listing
"Broken Wings" – 4:20
"No More, No Less" – 3:07
"She" – 3:28
"Same Ol' Trip" – 3:57
"Yellow Lines" – 5:09

Personnel
 Ryan McCombs – vocals
 Adam Zadel – guitar, backing vocals
 Shaun Glass – guitar
 Tim King – bass guitar
 Tom Schofield – drums

References

1997 debut EPs
Soil (American band) albums